The 1989 Fort Lauderdale Strikers season was the second season of the team in the new American Soccer League.  It was the club's twenty-third season in professional soccer.  The team finished in second place in the Southern Division, and made it through the playoffs and into the ASL Championship.  They became the 1989 Champions.  They also won the 1989 National Pro Soccer Championship which pitted the ASL Champions against the Western Soccer League Champions in a unification match to determine a national champion.  Following the season, the American Soccer League merged with the WSL to form the American Professional Soccer League in 1990.  The team would be absorbed into the new league and continue to play there.

Background

Review

Competitions

ASL regular season

Results summaries

Results by round

Match reports

ASL Playoffs

Bracket

Semifinal 1

Semifinal 2

Final

1989 National Professional Soccer Championship
On September 9, 1989, the WSL (WSA) Champion San Diego Nomads played the ASL Champion Fort Lauderdale Strikers in order to crown a "national" champion for the first time since 1984.  The game was played at Spartan Stadium in San Jose, California before 8,632 fans.  The match remained scoreless until the 74th minute when San Diego's Jerome Watson scored on a Thien Nguyen free kick.  Just over a minute later, national team forward Eric Eichmann scored for Fort Lauderdale.  Ten minutes later Troy Edwards put the Strikers ahead on a Marcelo Carrera assist in the 85th minute.  Carrera got a goal of his own when he scored in the 90th minute on an assist from Victor Moreland.  His efforts earned Carrera man-of-the-match honors. The game was televised live by Pacific Sports Network, with  JP Dellacamera providing play-by-play and Rick Davis adding color commentary.

Match report

Statistics

Transfers

References 

1989
Fort Lauderdale Strikers
Fort Lauderdale Strikers